SM U-157 was one of the 329 submarines serving in the Imperial German Navy in World War I. 
U-157 was engaged in the naval warfare and took part in the First Battle of the Atlantic.

Summary of raiding history

References

Notes

Citations

Bibliography

World War I submarines of Germany
1917 ships
U-boats commissioned in 1917
Ships built in Hamburg
German Type U 151 submarines